Nekemte Airport  is an airport serving Nekemte, Oromia Region, Ethiopia.

See also

List of airports in Ethiopia

References

Airports in Ethiopia